Spiller Inlet is an inlet in the North Coast region of the Canadian province of British Columbia. It forms the head of Spiller Channel. It was first charted in 1793 by James Johnstone, one of George Vancouver's officers during his 1791-95 expedition.

References

Inlets of British Columbia
North Coast of British Columbia